Pidford Manor is a manor house in Rookley, on the Isle of Wight, England.

Built in the mid to late 18th century, the front is of red bick. A doorcase features an open pediment over an arched doorway, while the interior has a Chinese Chippendale well staircase. The stable (c. 1795) at Pidford Manor became a Grade II listed building in 1993.

References

Manor houses in England
Country houses on the Isle of Wight
Georgian architecture in England